The 1987 Giro d'Italia was the 70th edition of the Giro d'Italia, one of cycling's Grand Tours. The Giro began in San Remo, with a prologue individual time trial on 21 May, and Stage 11 occurred on 2 June with a stage from Giulianova. The race finished in Saint-Vincent on 13 June.

Stage 11
2 June 1987 — Giulianova to Osimo,

Stage 12
3 June 1987 — Osimo to Bellaria,

Stage 13
4 June 1987 — Rimini to San Marino,  (ITT)

Stage 14
5 June 1987 — San Marino to Lido di Jesolo,

Stage 15
6 June 1987 — Lido di Jesolo to Sappada,

Stage 16
7 June 1987 — Sappada to Canazei,

Stage 17
8 June 1987 — Canazei to Riva del Garda,

Stage 18
9 June 1987 — Riva del Garda to Trescore Balneario,

Stage 19
10 June 1987 — Trescore Balneario to Madesimo,

Stage 20
11 June 1987 — Madesimo to Como,

Stage 21
12 June 1987 — Como to Pila,

Stage 22
13 June 1987 — Aosta to Saint-Vincent,  (ITT)

References

1987 Giro d'Italia
Giro d'Italia stages